Richard Willard Mies (born May 30, 1944) is a retired United States Navy admiral who served as the fourth Commander in Chief of United States Strategic Command from 1998 to 2001.

Naval career
Mies graduated first in his class from the United States Naval Academy in 1967 with a Bachelor of Science degree with majors in mechanical engineering and mathematics. While at the academy, Mies participated in lightweight football and intercollegiate wrestling. He was "all-league" as a football end, and eastern champion as a wrestler.

He has served in various command positions, including: Commander, Submarine Development Squadron Twelve; Commander, Submarine Group Eight; and Commander, Submarine Force United States Atlantic Fleet. His staff positions included Chief of Staff to Commander Submarine Force, United States Pacific Fleet, and Director, Strategic Target Plans and Deputy Director, Plans and Policy on the staff of Commander in Chief, United States Strategic Command. Mies completed postgraduate education at the University of Oxford, England, the Fletcher School of Law and Diplomacy at Tufts University, and Harvard University. He holds a master's degree in government administration and international relations.

Mies, a Chicago native, is a qualified submariner and naval aviation observer. His personal awards and decorations include the Defense Distinguished Service Medal, Navy Distinguished Service Medal, Defense Superior Service Medal (two awards), Legion of Merit (four awards), National Intelligence Distinguished Service Medal, Meritorious Service Medal (two awards), Navy and Marine Corps Commendation Medal (four awards), Navy and Marine Corps Achievement Medal, and Secretary of Energy Gold Medal.

References

United States Navy admirals
United States Naval Academy alumni
Navy Midshipmen football players
Navy Midshipmen wrestlers
Recipients of the Legion of Merit
1944 births
Military personnel from Chicago
Harvard University alumni
Living people
Recipients of the Defense Superior Service Medal
Recipients of the Defense Distinguished Service Medal
Recipients of the Navy Distinguished Service Medal
Recipients of the National Intelligence Distinguished Service Medal